James Alan Gardner (born January 10, 1955) is a Canadian science fiction author.

Raised in Simcoe and Bradford, Ontario, he earned bachelor's and master's degrees in applied mathematics from the University of Waterloo.

Gardner has published science fiction short stories in a range of periodicals, including The Magazine of Fantasy and Science Fiction and Amazing Stories. In 1989, his short story "The Children of Creche" was awarded the Grand Prize in the Writers of the Future contest. Two years later his story "Muffin Explains Teleology to the World at Large" won a Prix Aurora Award; another story, "Three Hearings on the Existence of Snakes in the Human Bloodstream," won an Aurora and was nominated for both the Nebula and Hugo Awards.

He has written a number of novels in a "League of Peoples" universe in which murderers are defined as "dangerous non-sentients" and are killed if they try to leave their solar system by aliens who are so advanced that they think of humans like humans think of bacteria. This precludes the possibility of interstellar wars.

He has also explored themes of gender in his novels, including Commitment Hour in which people change sex every year, and Vigilant in which group marriages are traditional.

Gardner is also an educator and technical writer. His book Learning UNIX is used as a textbook in some Canadian universities.

He lives in Waterloo, Ontario.

Bibliography

Lara Croft, Tomb Raider series
 No. 3 Lara Croft and the Man of Bronze

League of Peoples universe

 Commitment Hour (1998) 
 Trapped (2002)
 Festina Ramos series:
 Expendable (1997) 
 Vigilant (1999)
 Hunted (2000)
 Ascending (2001)
 Radiant (2004)

Short story collections
 Gravity Wells (2005)

The Dark vs. Spark 
 All Those Explosions Were Someone Else's Fault (2017)
 They Promised Me the Gun Wasn't Loaded (2018)

Non-fiction
 Learning UNIX (1994)
 From C to C (1995)

See also
List of science fiction authors
Sex in Science Fiction
UNIX
 List of University of Waterloo people

External links
 James Alan Gardner's homepage
 The Two Solitudes: An Interview with James Alan Gardner
 Challenging Destiny: James Alan Gardner Explains Himself to the World at Large
 Strange Horizons Interview: James Alan Gardner

1955 births
Living people
Canadian science fiction writers
People from Norfolk County, Ontario
University of Waterloo alumni
Canadian male short story writers